Andy Jones may refer to:

Sports
Andy Jones (footballer, born 1963), Welsh former footballer
Andy Jones (diver) (born 1985), American high diver, acrobat, and stuntman
Andy Jones (American football) (born 1994), American football wide receiver
Andy Jones-Wilkins (born 1968), American ultrarunner

Other people
Andy Jones (comedian) (born 1948), Canadian comedian, writer, actor, and director
Andy Jones (game designer) (1990s)
Andy Wooding Jones (born 1961), Archdeacon of Rochester
Andy Jones (EastEnders), soap opera character

See also
Andi Jones (born 1978), English athlete
Andrew Jones (disambiguation)